"I Am House" is a song recorded, co-written, and produced by American singer Crystal Waters featuring the American production duo Sted-e & Hybrid Heights. The House-themed single reached number one on Billboard's Dance Club Songs chart in its April 21, 2018 issue, giving Waters her twelfth number one, as well as the third for the duo, each with previous collaborations with Waters.

Track listing
Digital download
 "I Am House" (radio edit) – 3:10
 "I Am House" (Masters at Work Radio Mix) – 3:19
 "I Am House" (Jacob Colon Radio Edit) – 3:56
 "I Am House" (Kidzblock Radio Mix) – 3:59
 "I Am House" (Norty Cotto Radio Mix) – 3:42

Charts

Weekly charts

Year-end charts

References

External links
Official audio (club version) at YouTube

2018 songs
2018 singles
Crystal Waters songs
Electronic songs